Denice as a feminine given name is of French derivation, and means "follower of Dionysius". The name is a version of Denise (French): feminine of Dennis.

Denice
Denice Andrée, Swedish model
Denice D. Lewis (born 1960), American fashion model, actor, abstract artist, photographer, philanthropist and socialite
Denice Denton (1959 – 2006), American administrator
Denice Duff (born 1965), American actress, director, and photographer
Denice Frohman, American poet, writer, performer and educator
Denice Klarskov (born 1986), Danish pornographic actress and entrepreneur

See also

Deniece Williams
Denise (given name)
Denyce

Feminine given names